Grafton Township is a township in Walsh County, North Dakota, United States. 51.1% (167) of the population are male, and the other 48.9% (160) are female. As of the 2010 census, the population of Grafton Township is 327.

References

See also
Walsh County, North Dakota

Townships in North Dakota
Townships in Walsh County, North Dakota